Mogul is a census-designated place (CDP) in Washoe County, Nevada, United States. It lies on the western side of the Reno–Sparks Metropolitan Statistical Area, just off Interstate 80. The population was 1,290 at the 2010 census. Prior to 2010, the community was part of the Verdi-Mogul CDP.

Geography
Mogul is located at  (39.5138, -119.9260).

The area is served by the Washoe County School District.

2008 earthquake swarm

In February 2008, an earthquake swarm began and activity was high until June 2008. The total number of earthquakes in the area reached over 5,000 and ranged from negative magnitudes to a moment magnitude 5.0 mainshock on April 26, 2008.

Demographics

References

External links

Census-designated places in Washoe County, Nevada
Census-designated places in Nevada
Reno, NV Metropolitan Statistical Area